Ungaliophis panamensis, or the Panamanian dwarf boa, is a species of nonvenomous snake in the family Tropidophiidae. It is native to Nicaragua, Costa Rica, Panama, and Colombia. Its diet is not entirely known, but it has been observed feeding on bats, birds and geckos.

References

Tropidophiidae
Reptiles of Colombia
Reptiles of Costa Rica
Reptiles of Nicaragua
Reptiles of Panama
Reptiles described in 1933
Snakes of Central America